This is a list of named geological features on asteroid 243 Ida and its moon, Dactyl.

Ida

Regiones

Idaean regiones (geologically distinct areas) are named after the discoverer of the asteroid, and the places where he worked.

Dorsa

Craters 

Idaean craters are named after famous caves.

Dactyl  

Dactylian craters are named after the mythological Dactyls.

External links
 USGS: Ida nomenclature
 USGS: Dactyl nomenclature

Ida
Binary asteroids